Gorytvesica chara is a species of moth of the family Tortricidae. It is endemic to Ecuador (Morona-Santiago Province).

The ground colour of the forewings is brown, with cream brown spots in the terminal area and along the dorsum. The hindwings are greyish brown, but cream costally.

Etymology
The species name refers to the colouration of the markings and is derived from Greek chara (meaning nice).

References

External links

Moths described in 2006
Endemic fauna of Ecuador
Euliini
Moths of South America
Taxa named by Józef Razowski